Neocoenyra jordani is a butterfly in the family Nymphalidae. It is found in Tanzania.

Subspecies
Neocoenyra jordani jordani (eastern Tanzania)
Neocoenyra jordani septentrionalis Kielland, 1990 (eastern Tanzania)

References

Satyrini
Butterflies described in 1906
Endemic fauna of Tanzania
Butterflies of Africa